Janez Pišek was a Slovenian football manager and former player. He played for AŠK Primorje most of his career and later managed various clubs in the Yugoslav Second League. He became first professional Slovenian football coach and first president of Slovenian Football Coach Association in 1953. After his death he received a Blodek plaque for life work in Slovenian football.

References
  Pišek at the Football Association of Slovenia website 
  Football Association of Slovenia archive 
  Bloudek plaques

1911 births
1991 deaths
Footballers from Ljubljana
Yugoslav footballers
Slovenian footballers
Association football midfielders
Slovenian football managers